Georges Gandil (18 May 1926 – 24 October 1999) was a French sprint canoeist who competed in the late 1940s. He won two bronze medals at the 1948 Summer Olympics in London, earning them in the C-2 1000 m and C-2 10000 m events.

References
Georges Gandil's profile at Sports Reference.com

1926 births
1999 deaths
Canoeists at the 1948 Summer Olympics
French male canoeists
Olympic canoeists of France
Olympic bronze medalists for France
Olympic medalists in canoeing
Medalists at the 1948 Summer Olympics